The Kurdistan Region parliamentary elections of 2005 for the parliament of the Kurdistan Region, were held on 30 January 2005, to coincide with the January 2005 Iraqi parliamentary election and elections to the governorate councils. It was the first parliamentary election to be held in Kurdistan Region since 1992.

Results

Election data from the Kurdistan National Assembly

Voting Breakdown by Governorate

Alliance Breakdown
Democratic Patriotic Alliance of Kurdistan party breakdown:
Kurdistan Democratic Party - 40
Patriotic Union of Kurdistan - 38
Kurdistan Islamic Union - 9 
Turkmen Democratic Movement - 4
Kurdistan Communist Party - 3
Kurdistan Socialist Democratic Party - 2
Assyrian Democratic Movement- 2 
Chaldean Cultural Society - 1
Bet Nahrain Democratic Party - 1
Chaldean Democratic Union Party - 1 
Farmers Movement Party - 1 
Democratic National Union of Kurdistan - 1  
Independent Nouri Talabany - 1

The Kurdish National Assembly did not sit until 4 June 2005.

References 
 Independent Electoral Commission of Iraq

2005 elections in Iraq
2005 in Iraqi Kurdistan
2005